Diabolo is a 1992 Ghanaian film that tells the story of a man who has the power to transform into a serpent. He uses this power to sexually assault and kill women, mostly sex workers. The character is played by Bob Smith Junior, subsequently popularly referred to as Diabolo Man or Snake Man.

The film has been studied as an example of Pentacostal influence in Ghanaian film.

Cast
 Bob Smith Junior
 Eddie Coffie
 Eunice Banini
 Prince Yawson (Wakye)

References

Ghanaian drama films
1990s English-language films
English-language Ghanaian films